This is a list of recognized string quartets (i.e. groups of musical performers), current or past, in alphabetical order. It does not include the names of musical quartet compositions.

A
Abramyan String Quartet
Aeolian
Aizuri Quartet
Alban Berg
Alberni
ALEA
Alexander
Allegri
Amadeus
Amar
Amati
American SQ
Amphion String Quartet
Amsterdam String Quartet
Ancora String Quartet
Annex String Quartet
Apple Hill String Quartet
Arcanto Quartet
Arditti Quartet
Ariel String Quartet
Aron Quartet
Arpeggione
Artaria String Quartet
Artemis Quartet
Atom String Quartet
Atrium String Quartet
Audubon Quartet
Australian String Quartet
Aviv String Quartet

B
Badke Quartet
Balanescu Quartet
Barcelona
Bartók Quartet
Barylli Quartet
Bastiaan Quartet
Beethoven Quartet
Béla Quartet
Belcea Quartet
Berkshire String Quartet
Bessler Quartet
Blair Quartet
Bohemian Quartet
Bond
Borodin Quartet
Borromeo String Quartet
Boston String Quartet 
Brentano Quartet
Brodsky Quartet
Brooklyn Rider
Budapest Quartet original
Budapest String Quartet
Busch Quartet

C
Calder Quartet
Calidore String Quartet
Capet Quartet
Carducci Quartet
Carmel
Carmine Quartet
Carpe Diem String Quartet
Casals
Cassatt Quartet
Cavani Quartet
Chiara String Quartet
Chilingirian Quartet
Ciompi Quartet
Circadian String Quartet
Cleveland Quartet
Clinton String Quartet
The Composers Quartet
Concord String Quartet
Conservatory String Quartet 
ConTempo Quartet
Corigliano Quartet
Corvinus Quartet
Coull Quartet
Cuarteto Casals
Cuarteto Latinoamericano
Curtis String Quartet
Cypress Quartet
Czech Quartet

D
Dallas String Quartet
Danish Quartet
Danubius Quartet
Dartington String Quartet 
Delme Quartet
Del Sol Quartet
Dolce Vita String Quartet
Dover Quartet
Dubois String Quartet 
Duke Quartet

E
Ébène Quartet
Element Quartet
Emerson String Quartet
Endellion Quartet
Enesco Quartet
English String Quartet
Enso String Quartet
Escala
Escher String Quartet
Esmé Quartet
Esterhazy Quartet
Ethel
Euclid Quartet
Entheos String Quartet

F
Fanny Mendelssohn Quartet
Festetics String Quartet
Fine Arts Quartet
Fitzwilliam Quartet
Fleshquartet
Flonzaley Quartet
Flux Quartet
Formosa Quartet
FourPlay String Quartet
Fred Sherry String Quartet
Fry Street Quartet

G
Gabrieli Quartet
Galatea Quartet
Galimir Quartet
Gaya Quartet
Gewandhaus
Goldner String Quartet
Griller Quartet
Guarneri Quartet

H
Hagen Quartet
Hampton String Quartet
Harlem Quartet
Hawthorne String Quartet
Hellmesberger Quartet
Henschel Quartet
Henry Holst String Quartet
Hollywood String Quartet
Hugo Wolf Quartet
Hungarian Quartet

J
JACK Quartet
Jade String Quartet
Janáček Quartet
Jasper String Quartet
Jerusalem Quartet
Juilliard String Quartet
Jupiter String Quartet

K
Kneisel Quartet
Kocian Quartet
Kodály Quartet
Kolisch Quartet
Komitas Quartet
Kopelman Quartet
Krettly Quartet
Kreutzberger Quartet
Kreutzer Quartet
Kronos Quartet
Kuss Quartet
Kutcher String Quartet

L
Laclede Quartet
Lark Quartet
LaSalle Quartet
Léner Quartet
Leningrad Taneiev Quartet
Lindsay String Quartet
Loewenguth Quartet
London Haydn Quartet
London Quartet
Ludwig Schuster

M
MacNaghten String Quartet
Maggini Quartet
Marie Hall
Marie Soldat-Roeger Quartet
Marmen Quartet
Martinů Quartet
Mecklenburg Quartet (Saint Petersburg)
Medici Quartet
Melos Quartet
Methera
Miami String Quartet
Midnight String Quartet
Miró Quartet
Modigliani Quartet
Moscow String Quartet
Moyzes Quartet
Müller Brothers
Musica Viva Australia

N
Nevine String Quartet
Nevsky String Quartet
New Hungarian Quartet
New Italian Quartet
New Orford String Quartet
New Vlach
New World String Quartet
New Zealand String Quartet

O
Oberlin String Quartet
Olive Mead Quartet
Orford String Quartet
Orion String Quartet
Orlando Quartet
Oslo String Quartet

P
Pacifica Quartet
Paganini Quartet
Panocha Quartet
Parisii Quartet
Parrenin Quartet
Pascal Quartet
Pavel Haas Quartet
Penderecki String Quartet
Perolé Quartet
Petersen Quartet
Philadelphia String Quartet
Philharmonia Quartet
Philharmonia Quartet Berlin
Philharmonic Quartet
Prague Quartet
Pražák Quartet
Prima Vista Quartet
Pro Arte Quartet

Q
Quatuor Bozzini
Quartet de Barcelona
Quarteto Bessler-Reis 
Quartetto di Cremona
Quartetto Energie Nove
Quartetto Italiano
Quatuor Arpeggione
Quatuor Mosaïques

R
radio.string.quartet.vienna
RaVen Quartet
Regent String Quartet
Rosamunde Quartett
Rosé Quartet
RTÉ Vanbrugh Quartet
Rubio Quartet

S
Sacconi Quartet
St. Lawrence Quartet
St. Petersburg String Quartet
Salomon Quartet
San Francisco
Schumann  Quartet
Schuppanzigh Quartet
Section Quartet
Ševčík-Lhotský Quartet
Shanghai String Quartet
Shostakovich
Signum String Quartet
Silesian String Quartet
SKAZ String Quartet
Skyros Quartet
Smetana Quartet
Smith Quartet
Soldier String Quartet
Somogyi String Quartet
Sonus Quartet
Soweto String Quartet
Spektral Quartet
Spencer Dyke Quartet
Stamic Quartet
Stanford String Quartet
Strub Quartet
Stratton Quartet (original)

T
T'ang Quartet
Takács Quartet
Talich Quartet
Taneyev
Tátrai Quartet
Tokyo String Quartet
Toronto String Quartette
Turtle Island String Quartet

U
Utrecht String Quartet

V
Vaghy String Quartet
Végh Quartet
Vermeer Quartet
Vertavo String Quartet
Villiers Quartet
Virtuoso Quartet
Vitamin String Quartet
Vlach Quartet

Vogler Quartet

W
Walden String Quartet
Wihan Quartet

Y
Yale Quartet
Ysaÿe Quartet (1886)
Ysaÿe Quartet (1984)
Ying Quartet

Z
Zagreb Quartet (1919–present)
Zephyr Quartet
Zoellner Quartet
Zorian Quartet

References

A. Eaglefield-Hull, A Dictionary of Modern Music and Musicians (Dent, London 1924) (pre-1924 entries)
R.D. Darrell, The Gramophone Shop Encyclopedia of Recorded Music (New York 1936)
J.R. Bennett, Smetana on 3000 Records (Oakwood Press, 1974)
E. Sackville-West and D. Shawe-Taylor, The Record Year 2 (Collins, London 1953)

External links
 Website listing quartets and members